Alejandro Llorca Castillo (born January 26, 1989) is a Spanish basketball player, who plays for Club Melilla Baloncesto of the LEB Oro. He is a shooting guard

He signed with Fuenlabrada in September 2015. Llorca spent the 2020–21 season with Girona, averaging 9.2 points and 2.8 rebounds per game. On October 1, 2021, he signed with Club Melilla Baloncesto.

National team
Llorca has played with National 3x3 team, winning the silver medal at the 2015 European Games.

References

External links
 ACB profile 
 FEB profile

1989 births
Living people
Baloncesto Fuenlabrada players
Basketball players at the 2015 European Games
Bàsquet Manresa players
Basketball players from Catalonia
CB Breogán players
CB L'Hospitalet players
CB Lucentum Alicante players
CB Tarragona players
CB Vic players
Força Lleida CE players
European Games medalists in basketball
European Games silver medalists for Spain
Liga ACB players
People from Esplugues de Llobregat
Sportspeople from the Province of Barcelona
Spanish men's 3x3 basketball players
Spanish men's basketball players
Shooting guards